Clusane d'Iseo is an Italian village situated in the northern part of Italy, in Lombardy by Lake Iseo.

Main sights 

 Carmagnola Castle is situated on a little hill in the historic centre of the village. It was built under the government of Oldofredi, a local feudal family, in the 14th century, but its current name is more recent:  in 1427 The Republic of Venice obtained this castle and then it was given to an important chieftain, Francesco di Bussone, called Carmagnola. Now the castle is private but it's possible to visit it by appointment. It has got a square plan with a central court, and in the past there was a deep defensive ditch with a drawbridge.
 Cristo Re's Church
 Gervasius and Protasius's Church

Public transport 
It is possible to reach Clusane d'Iseo by bus or by boat.

Events 
Every year during the third week of July in Clusane d'Iseo takes place the "Settimana della tinca al forno" (the week of the roast tench).

References

External links 
 

Cities and towns in Lombardy
Province of Brescia